Hubertus Bernardus "Huub" Bals (February 3, 1937 – July 13, 1988) was the first director and creator of International Film Festival Rotterdam (IFFR), formerly named Film International. IFFR started small in the Calypso cinema and film theatre 't Venster (now Lantaren/Venster) in Rotterdam, The Netherlands, in 1972, with only 4500 visitors and 31 films. In the forthcoming years the film festival expanded gradually under the watchful cinephile eye of Bals to 150.000 visitors and multiple cinemas in 1988 – Bals' last festival – and developed into an annual film event of great international importance, with already more than 350.000 visitors in 2010. Thanks to Bals many new film countries and continents have been introduced to The Netherlands, among which Russia, China, Taiwan, Africa and Latin-America. 'The masters of the cinema of tomorrow are from the Third World.'

Early life
Huub Bals was born to Hubertus Bernardus Bals and Lamberta Snellenberg in Utrecht on February 3, 1937. His parents were simple, Catholic citizens from the traditional Wijk C in Utrecht, who traded in animal-waste products.
Just before the Second World War, they moved to the working-class district Ondiep in the same city.

Organizing and programming was Bals like a glove. During his time at highschool, the Catholic Bonifatius Lyceum in Utrecht, he set up a small singing group - for which Bals wrote his own lyrics on well-known pop songs - and was the leader of the club Dragnet; a small group of friends that used to listen to music from the American Forces Network in Germany on the radio, play records and gamble. Furthermore, he contributed to Minjon, AVRO radio's programme for youth, and the school newspaper Stemmen. His fellow students describe him as 'a solitary, not particularly nice boy, who liked arranging and organizing things and preferred to be in charge.'

During his highschool years, Bals developed a particular love for jazz; he gave lectures on jazz at school and once travelled to Bonn for an interview with Gernot Haefeker, the chairman of a jazz-club, for the school paper. It was partly this predilection for jazz that eventually made Bals quit his high school education, which he never completed. He got a job in the publicity department of the Dutch Phonogram Record Company and worked as a jazz impresario; among other things, he organized jazz concerts and performances with international stars at several locations in the Netherlands.

In April 1957, Bals was called up for military service, which ended his music activities in Utrecht. However, even in the military, Bals could not let go of his passion for organizing; as a Welfare Officer he took care of the entertainment for the NCO's and organized all kinds of parties and film evenings. This is where his interest in film began to develop.

Employment at Wolff
When Bals returned from his military service in January 1959, it only took him one month to find a new job. He got hired as assistant-manager at the cinema Camera/Studio of the Wolff Cinema Group, a combination of an arthouse cinema (Studio) and a public theatre (Camera). This position has been of great importance for the rest of Bals' career in the film world. Wolff allowed him the freedom to organize all kinds of events, as for example special filmweeks, like a Bergman film week and a Chaplin festival, in Studio. The first international film week in Studio in February 1963, organized on its seventh anniversary, is often seen as the source of the eventual International Film Festival of Rotterdam.

Bals had the reputation of always creating the right atmosphere in the cinema's, by means of big publicity stunts. When La belle americaine was being screened (1962) he had a large American car driven through the centre, at the premiere of Zorba the Creek visitors could learn to dance the sirtaki, and in the case of a ghost film he made sure the cinema hall was filled with a big spider's web. Films that flopped in the rest of The Netherlands could run for weeks in Studio. 'He had a perfect nose for attracting the right people to help him carry out his ideas (...) who made sure that the exteriors of the cinemas always looked different and always sparked the imagination.'

In 1966, Bals started to organize the Cinemanifestatie Utrecht for Wolff; an international film festival which introduced many new directors from diverse countries and new film movements like the Nouvelle Vague to the Netherlands and grew out to be an important biennial film event in the sixties. It was in these years that Bals developed his passion and personal taste for films: ‘I began to devour films, by the bucketload! No, no preferences, it was a long time before that happened. I didn’t yet fully understand films by people like Antonioni or Buñuel, but gradually I did begin to experience a certain feeling, something like ‘hey, put your brain on hold and just take it in.’ It wasn’t taught, the feeling, it was just out there.’ In the same year he married Marjolijn de Vries whom he met at the cinema they were both working at.

After Huub was no longer involved in the organization of the Cinemanifestatie (1972) - he organized it four times - the event only lasted for three times: '(...) Everyone is in agreement that Utrecht doesn't have 'it' anymore.'

Besides his work for Wolff, Bals also worked on another project, for which he bore full responsibility: on June 20, 1973 he opened the very first filmhouse 't Hoogt in Utrecht.

Film International

With the work he did for Wolff - the Cinemanifestatie, the Filmweeks, special screenings, etc. - Bals had gained a tremendous reputation as an organizer of festivals in The Netherlands. 'The International Film Guide (...) made mention of a new phenomenon in the international film world: "The energetic Hubert Bals".'
One of them was Adriaan van Staay, managing director of the Rotterdam Arts Foundation, who wanted Bals to help improving the film climate in Rotterdam by means of a festival, analogous to the avant-garde Poetry International. Film International was born; a unique combination of a film festival ánd a distribution company, and a platform for the 'noconformist filmmaker'.

Although the opening of the first Film International in Calypso on Wednesday June 28, 1972, with the screening of The Postman by the Iranian director Dariush Mehrjui, only counted seventeen visitors, the festival turned out to be a major success, partly thanks to the publicity and programming skills of Bals. To promote the festival, he for example sent hostesses to Amsterdam, armed with a couple of thousand festival folders, with provocative texts such as Keep your trap shut in discussions about films if you haven't been to Film International. It worked; the first Film International attracted around 4500 visitors, screened forty films, and kept growing extensively in the forthcoming years.
In the same year of the birth of International Film Festival Rotterdam, his son, Boris Bals, was born. Actually even during the festival, which was back then still in June, later on he moved it to February, because he could have scoops of films that later on would be shown in Berlin and Cannes.

Film International gave Bals the opportunity to introduce new directors and film countries to The Netherlands. He strongly believed that 'the American cinema was dying' and used the Rotterdam festival to show 'films about which we have the feeling that they cannot yet be shown in the normal cinema.' He travelled around the world and visited a wide range of filmfestivals, among which Venice, Cannes, Edinburgh, Berlin and Locarno, and cities such as Rio de Janeiro, New York City, Belgrade and Lisbon, where he watched around seven hundred films a year. He did everything to find the right, qualitative films for Film International. According to Bals, the masters of the cinema were to be found in the Third World, which made him introduce continents such as Asia, Africa and Latin-America, to the festival. 'As no other, Bals selected these films, without ever making compromises or deals.'

Besides films, Bals enriched the festival with, among other things, discussions, talks with the film makers - the 'Q&A's' of the current festival -, all kinds of parties, the Filmkrant and the currently well known international co-production market Cinemart, which he introduced in 1984.

1984 was also the year Bals got his first heart attack. However, he did not reduce his work or lessen his bad habits; as a real bon-vivant smoking, drinking and eating had become part of his life. The heart attack did have a big influence on his life and character: in the following years Bals became melancholic, pessimistic and exhausted. 'This festival really breaks me. (...) There is nothing that satisfies me anymore, except for grabbing a new film. And that keeps taking more and more energy. You have to travel so incredibly far to discover things, because there is no talent.'

On the evening of July 13, 1988, Bals suddenly died of a second heart attack. His plans for the Tarkovsky Fund, meant to help film makers - mainly from the Third World - to get their projects off the ground, were realized after his death with the Hubert Bals Fund. This fund for the support of film makers from Asia, the Middle East, Eastern Europe, Africa and Latin America still exists in the current film festival.

Remarkable quotes of Bals
'What I would like is that in this country every possible means is used to teach the people the love for cinematography. (...) Let the State buy all the rights and screen the films for free, like you are going to a parc or a museum. Just film.'
'You should see me a day after the festival. So hollow and dispirited, so depressed.'
'I can easily drop a new film after only five minutes of watching, then I am done with it. Of course, I may be wrong, but if the first five minutes of a film are not right, it cannot become a good film anymore.'
'The American cinema is dying.'
'Watching a good film is better than screwing.'
'Every unsuccessful film in The Netherlands that is being released, is one step back. To me, that is a sin, anti-cinema. The people who make those films have to be retrained to cake bakers, so that they can make cheap, delicious things.'
'Every now and then I really have to cry, when I unexpectedly open a door in the Lumière theatre and see a mass of people sitting there.'
'It's a clear to me as the nose on my face that there can be only one captain on this festival ship. As regards the choice of the programme, there can be no question of anything like a collective.'
'You'd be lucky if every year a page could be added to the big book of artfilm.'

Remarkable quotes about Bals
'He was surprisingly knowledgable about sex, could drink plenty and was a first-rate organizer.'
'One of the best films I have ever seen was Höhenfeuer by Fredi Murer, and I was surprised that Huub didn't programme it for Rotterdam. He told me that he had walked out after having seen the first shot in which the mountains came into view. He simply couldn't stand films with mountains. In fact, he was unbelievably impatient, and in that sense actually prejudiced.'
'He was the sort of person about whom you can sense immediately that he loved films, and probably very little else. He was demanding and inflexible in the things he wanted to see.'
'All sorts of things were possible with Huub, such as Straub and American soft porn, a sort of mixture. He used to see all the films himself, which was exceptional, about a thousand films every year.'
'Huub had an elemental instinct, with a feeling for the aesthetic; he saw the importance of the message of a film within its context, and had a strong feeling for its social role in our society. That made him an exception in the period at the end of the sixties and the beginning of the seventies.'
'(...) A tall but not fat, active chap with a natural air of authority and aggravated film mania, someone who was totally addicted to films and who could be as bold as brass.'
'Bals was a sort of good doctor for young filmmakers, one who helped them deliver the goods.'
'One of his beliefs was that visits to the cinema should be covered by the National Health Service.'
'He was (...) cantankerous, greedy, bossy and introvert. He couldn't speak about his film preferences, liked blunt statements, was the opposite of the reasonable intellectual, didn't care about anybody and had a lot of enemies, especially in the Netherlands.'

References

Bibliography

External links
International Film Festival Rotterdam (official website)
IFFR Youtube Channel

1937 births
1988 deaths
Dutch directors
Film festival directors
Film festival founders
Mass media people from Utrecht (city)